Meiju Annele Suvas-Berger (born 22 January 1959), professionally known as Meiju Suvas, is a Finnish singer.

Career beginnings

Music has been a part of Meiju Suvas' life from a very young age. She started to take piano lessons at the age of four, and later learned to play drums. Suvas formed her first band when she was 13 and made her first demo in 1981. That year she also met with singer Frederik who made her his background singer for the song "Titanic" which was competing for becoming Finland's Eurovision Song Contest entry. While her first double-sided single "Rakastuneet lapset / Jos pyydät yöksi" did not really take off, her second release "Tahdon sinut / Oot paha" made her a household name in 1982.

Successful years

In 1982, Meiju Suvas released her first album Meiju which sold over 54,000 copies. More albums followed on a steady flow until 2001. Eleven years later, in 2012, she returned with her 13th studio album Missä milloin vaan. In addition, she has released eight compilation albums during her career.

Suvas has recorded several Finnish versions of international songs. Some of the most successful ones are "Viet itsekontrollin" (1984), originally "Self Control" by Laura Branigan, and "Pure mua" (1992), a cover of a Lalo Rodríguez song "Ven, devórame otra vez". In 2012, Meiju Suvas appeared as a featured guest, along with a rapper Stig, on a Teflon Brothers single "Seksikkäin jäbä". In the video, she is seen bathing in a jacuzzi with Stig while singing a sampled line from her 1983 song "Pidä musta kiinni".

Personal life

Meiju Suvas is married to John "Jontte" Berger. They have two children.

Discography

Studio albums
Meiju (1982) 
Pidä musta kiinni (1983)
Tottakai (1984)
Rakkauden huoneet (1986)
Sydän tietää (1990)
Pure mua (1992)
Kaunotar ja kulkuri (1993)
Ystäväsi aina (1994)
Hokkuspokkus (1995)
Sukella sieluun asti (1996)
Sydänmyrsky (1998)
Taikavoima silmien (2001)
Missä milloin vaan (2012)

Compilations 
Tahdon sinut (1992)
Suomen parhaat (1994)
20 Suosikkia – Pure mua (1995)
20 Suosikkia – Sydänmyrsky (1999)
20 Suosikkia – Viet itsekontrollin (2001)
Hitit (2004)
Tähtisarja – 30 suosikkia (2006)
Juhlalevy Pure mua (2010)

Singles
Featured in

References

External links
Official Homepage of Meiju Suvas

Living people
20th-century Finnish women singers
21st-century Finnish women singers
1959 births